The 1947 Princess Anne Trojans football team was an American football team that represented Princess Anne College (now known as University of Maryland Eastern Shore) during the 1947 college football season. In their second and final season under head coach J. C. Coffee, the team compiled an 8–0 record and outscored all opponents by a total of 206 to 32. The team played its home games at Princess Anne Stadium in Princess Anne, Maryland.

The 1947 season was the school's last under the common name Princess Anne College. It was officially known as the University of Maryland's College for Negroes at Princess Anne and had previously been known as Maryland's Agricultural and Mechanical College for Negroes, though it had been commonly referred to as Princess Anne College. In 1948, the school's president, Dr. J. T. Williams, discarded the "Princess Anne College" name because "people thought it might be a girl's finishing school . . . it embarrassed the football team."

Schedule

References

Princess Anne
Maryland Eastern Shore Hawks football seasons
College football undefeated seasons
Princess Anne Trojans football